K. Wesley Pritchard sang with the Old Friends Quartet from 2000 through 2002. He filled in for Ernie Haase & Signature Sound in 2003, while they were seeking a new lead singer. He has traveled extensively with "Bill Gaither's Homecoming Friends" and can be seen on many of the Gaither Homecoming Videos/DVDs. He owns and operates Mill West Studios in Fayetteville, North Carolina. He is currently the senior pastor of the church his Father, Ken W. Pritchard founded – Fayetteville Community Church in Fayetteville, North Carolina.

References

Southern gospel performers
Living people
Year of birth missing (living people)